Ananta Group is a Bangladeshi garments conglomerate based in Dhaka.

History
Ananta was established in 1992 in Dhaka as an export oriented Ready Made Garment manufacturer by Humayun Zahir. After the death of Zahir, his wife Qamrun Nahar Zahir took over the company. She is support by their two children, Asif Zahir and Sharif Zahir, who help her run Ananta Group.

In 2016, the company launched Sindabad.com as an ecommerce site.

Ananta Group invested in Zero Gravity which is the holding company of sindabad.com and Kiksha.com, both of which are ecommerce sites in Bangladesh, on 19 February 2018. In April 2019, Asif Zahir announced plans to merge the seven units of the group to streamline management.

In 2019, the groups annual turnover exceeded US$ 300 million. It operates a green factory. The company was given 250 acres land in Chittagong to establish six factories at the Mirsarai Economic Zone by Bangladesh Economic Zones Authority through a 50 year lease. The company announced plans to invest 35 billion taka to develop the site. In July 2019, Qamrun Nahar Zahir was awarded the Outstanding Woman in Business Award by the annual Bangladesh Business Award, which is organized by The Daily Star and DHL Express. She also received a nomination for an award from Entrepreneurs Organization's Bangladesh chapter for her contribution to the Sustainable Development Goals of the United Nations.

Ananta Group announced plans to invest US$ 25 million in a factory to manufacture lingerie in Chittagong Export Processing Zone on 16 October 2020. The group already owned five factories at the site. Two nominated directors, Khalid Quadir and Anders Stendebakken, CEOs of Brummer & Partners Asset Management in Bangladesh and Singapore respectively serves in the board of directors of Ananta Group.

Subsidiaries 

 Z&Z Intimates Limited
 Ananta Apparels Limited
 Ananta Denim Technology Limited
 Ananta Casualwear Limited
 Universal Menswear Limited
 Ananta Huaxiang Limited
 DNV Clothing Limited
 Ananta Terraces

References

1992 establishments in Bangladesh
Manufacturing companies based in Dhaka
Conglomerate companies of Bangladesh